Stingray (Walter Newell) is a fictional superhero appearing in American comic books published by Marvel Comics.

Publication history

The character first appears as Walter Newell in Tales to Astonish #95 (Sep. 1967) and as Stingray in Prince Namor, the Sub-Mariner #19 (Nov. 1969).

Roy Thomas publicly stated the characters creation, "I needed a villain for Sub Mariner, and wanted an underwater type (just like others I devised, like Tiger Shark and Orka the Human Killer Whale and Commander Kraken) who created a costume for his sub-sea life.  I think Marie Severin designed the costume pretty much on her own."

Fictional character biography
Walter Newell first appears in the title Tales to Astonish  as an oceanographer working for the United States government. The character encounters the human/Atlantean hybrid hero Namor the Sub-Mariner and his lover Lady Dorma, while supervising the construction of a domed sub-sea city whose purpose is to harvest food for mankind. The city, however, is destroyed by the villain the Plunderer. Newell becomes a perennial character in the title Prince Namor, the Sub-Mariner and aids the hero and Dorma against the villain Tiger Shark and is coerced by the government into investigating the disappearance of water from the Earth's oceans. This is attributed to aliens who are believed to be in league with Namor. Ordered to capture Namor, Newell develops a suit based on the form of the sea creature the manta ray, and as 'Stingray' captures Namor, who was weakened at the time. Newell, however, believes Namor to be innocent and allows him to escape.

Stingray aids Namor and the Inhuman Triton against a group of Atlanteans who destroy an ocean liner and falsely claim to have done so for Namor. The culprit is revealed to be Atlantean warlord Attuma, who is eventually defeated. Stingray assists Namor in a search for his father Leonard Mackenzie, with Mackenzie being accidentally killed in a battle with villains Llyra and Tiger Shark.

After brief appearances in titles the Hulk and Defenders respectively, Newell becomes a regular guest-star in the title Marvel Two-In-One. The character moves his oceanographic facilities and research to Hydro-Base, an artificial island previously used by the insane ecologist Doctor Hydro (occupied by Dr. Henry Croft and the passengers of an airplane, who were captured by Hydro and changed into merfolk known as the Hydro-Men). As Stingray, Newell aids Fantastic Four member the Thing; Triton and heroine the Scarlet Witch against the villains the Serpent Squad and company Roxxon Oil to prevent them from obtaining the artifact the Serpent Crown. Stingray is present when Mister Fantastic cures Croft and the other passengers, and aids the Thing, and Inhumans Gorgon and Karnak against Maelstrom's Minions, who steal a dose of the healing compound.

Newell marries Diane Arliss, the sister of Todd Arliss (the real name of villain Tiger Shark) and leased part of Hydro-Base to superhero team the Avengers, and becomes an associate member of the team. During the first "Armor Wars" storyline, Avenger Iron Man confronts Stingray, mistakenly believing that Newell's suit was based on technology stolen from Stark Enterprises, forcing Stark to publicly fire Iron Man to protect his company from being affected by his current actions after he confirmed that Stingray's suit had been independently created. Stingray aids the Avengers when Hydro-Base is invaded by Heavy Metal, a team of robot villains (consisting of the Super-Adaptoid, Machine Man, Awesome Android, TESS-One, and the Kree Sentry 459).

During the "Acts of Vengeance" storyline, the Hydro-Base is damaged by an attack from Doctor Doom's Doombots and sinks, with Stingray aiding the Avenger Quasar in a salvage operation, and then joining a group of reserve Avengers in a battle against the Mad Thinker's Awesome Android. In the title Marvel Comics Presents Stingray encounters now-brother-in-law Tiger Shark and after a battle work together to save Diane Arliss, who is trapped after a cave-in. The character aids the Avengers; Canadian super team Alpha Flight and the People's Protectorate during The Crossing Line storyline and with Namor battles a subterranean army.

After featuring in a Marvel Comics Presents solo story the character appears in the first storyline of the third volume of the title the Avengers and in the title Mutant X. Stingray aids the Avengers in an extended storyline against futuristic villain Kang the Conqueror; appears in the limited series Avengers/Thunderbolts and the final issues of the third volume of the Avengers.

During the "Civil War" storyline, Stingray is a member of the Secret Avengers – led by Captain America – who oppose the Superhuman Registration Act. After Captain America's arrest and subsequent death, Stingray accepts Tony Stark's (Iron Man's alter ego) offer of a full pardon, and joins The Initiative.

The character appears in another solo story in the second volume of Marvel Comics Presents and in an ongoing basis in the title Avengers: The Initiative.

During the "AXIS" storyline, Stingray is among the heroes recruited by an inverted Doctor Doom to join his team of Avengers. This group tries to focus on the innocent people put in danger where Scarlet Witch, now uncaring of morality, attacks Latveria. Stingray does his part by rescuing several people from a debris-filled river. His actions earn him the respect of U.S. Agent.

As part of the "All-New, All-Different Marvel," Stingray is seen as part of Deadpool's Mercs for Money. It is later revealed that Stingray is actually a double agent assigned to spy on Deadpool's team by Captain America.

During the "Secret Empire" storyline, Stingray appears as a member of the Underground which is a resistance movement following Hydra's takeover of the United States.

Stingray and Diane were later on a cruise that was attacked by Tiger Shark. Their fight took place underwater until Namor crashed it demanding their allegiance. When Stingray tried to reason with Namor, he is attacked by the War Sharks summoned by Namor forcing Tiger Shark to side with Namor. This attack left him near-death, but he survived as confirmed when the Avengers confronted Namor and the Defenders of the Deep about this action.

During the "Iron Man 2020" event, Stingray fought Captain Barracuda and his army of Robo-Buccaneers at the Bermuda Triangle. The battle was crashed by Machinesmith who persuaded the Robo-Buccaneers to join the A.I. Army. As the Robo-Buccaneers take up the offer and leave with Machinesmith, Stingray states to a confused Captain Barracuda that he will have to knock him out now.

Powers and abilities
Walter Newell designed and wears the Stingray battlesuit, an armored exoskeleton suit composed of a superhard artificial cartilage designed mainly for underwater use. The Stingray battlesuit enhances his strength and durability to superhuman levels, which allow him to operate within the crushing pressures of the ocean depths. His suit is equipped with an oxygen-diffusing system providing breathable air almost indefinitely, allowing him to breathe underwater. The suit also gives him enhanced swimming speed and its streamlined wings allow him to glide through air for great distances. The Stingray battlesuit's chief offensive weapon is a powerful electrical discharge device built into the exoskeleton, able to project bolts of up to 20,000 volts through air or water and released through the gloves. The suit grants protection against radiation.

Additionally, Walter Newell has a gifted intellect and has a Ph.D. in oceanography. He is an experienced oceanographer, and a skilled inventor of experimental oceanographic equipment.

Reception

Accolades 

 In 2015, Gizmodo ranked Stingray 66th in their "Every Member Of The Avengers" list.
Newsarama ranked Stingray as the tenth worst Avengers member, describing Stingray as "a guy in a cape with all the powers of a marine biologist."
 In 2022, Newsarama included Stingray in their "Best Marvel characters left to adapt to the MCU" list. 
 In 2022, Screen Rant ranked Stingray 9th in their "Marvel's 10 Most Powerful Aquatic Characters" list and included him in their "Namor's 10 Most Powerful Villains In Marvel Comics" list.

Other versions

Age of Apocalypse
In the Age of Apocalypse reality, Stingray is the captain of the submarine Excalibur which transports refugees to Avalon.

Marvel Zombies
Stingray is seen as part of the zombified horde of heroes in Ultimate Fantastic Four.

Mutant X
In the Mutant X reality, Stingray is a member of the Defenders. Stingray was on a mission in Atlantis when the Sentinels attack Avengers Mansion. He joined up with the Defenders to keep the Goblin Queen from getting into the Nexus of All Realities.

Secret Wars
During the "Secret Wars" storyline, a version of Stingray resides in the futuristic Battleworld domain of Technopolis (which is based on a world in which everyone wears armors to live and survive due to an unknown airborne virus). This version is a spy outfitted with an advanced suit of armor developed by Arno Stark. He is sent to spy on Kiri Oshiro by Arno Stark and Wilson Fisk and ends up trying to kill the girl and her friend Lila Rhodes after stating that he can't leave behind any witnesses. Kiri manages to defeat Stingray before he can kill Lila.

In other media
 Stingray appears in the Iron Man episode "The Armor Wars, Part 2", voiced by Tom Kane. This version is a naval command officer who can manipulate water and air.
 Stingray appears in Lego Marvel Super Heroes 2.

References

External links
 Stingray at Marvel.com

Avengers (comics) characters
Characters created by Bill Everett
Characters created by Roy Thomas
Comics characters introduced in 1969
Marvel Comics characters with superhuman strength
Marvel Comics scientists
Marvel Comics superheroes